Monica Lindeen (born May 16, 1962) is an American politician who served as the Montana State Auditor. She was elected in 2008 and re-elected in 2012. Due to term limits, she was ineligible to run again in 2016, and became a candidate for Montana Secretary of State.

Early life and education
Lindeen was born in Ogden, Utah. She earned a Bachelor of Science degree in education from Montana State University Billings, specializing in English and history.

Career 
Lindeen was a Democratic member of the Montana House of Representatives from 1999 to 2006, representing House District 43. Lindeen served as vice chair of the Montana Democratic Party from 1997 to 2000. In 1996, she ran for House District 7 but lost to the incumbent. 
	
Lindeen was a candidate for the United States House of Representatives in 2006, running against Republican incumbent Dennis Rehberg and Libertarian Mike Fellows for the lone Montana seat in the U.S. Congress. Lindeen lost the election with 39% of the vote to Rehberg's 59% and Fellows' 2%.

State Auditor
On February 19, 2007 Lindeen announced her plans to run for State Auditor in the 2008 elections.

Lindeen named Walt Schweitzer as Deputy State Auditor. Schweitzer, the brother of Governor Brian Schweitzer and a campaign consultant, had managed Lindeen's campaign. In the summer of 2009, an employee of the office, Laura McGee, formally complained to Lindeen that Schweitzer improperly "solicited campaign contributions from employees in the State Auditor’s office on state time." McGee was subsequently fired, and Schweitzer claimed to have no recollection of the events. McGee then filed a wrongful discharge lawsuit and an independent investigation was launched. Although the independent investigation did not substantiate McGee's allegation, in part because she did not cooperate with the investigator, the State Auditor's office nonetheless chose to settle the lawsuit. According to the Billings Gazette, "Investigating and settling McGee’s complaint cost the Auditor’s Office about $62,500," and in addition, Lindeen reinstated McGee to employment for a period of 16 months at her previous salary of $45,000 a year and allowed for remote work.

National Association of Insurance Commissioners
On November 4, 2011, Lindeen was elected Secretary-Treasurer of the National Association of Insurance Commissioners.
In 2013, Lindeen received the Excellence in Consumer Advocacy Award, presented by the NAIC’s Consumer Representatives. She received the honor in recognition for her work as a strong voice for consumer protection and her dedication in maintaining states’ rights in insurance regulation. She was elected to serve as the president of the NAIC throughout 2015. After serving eight years as the State Commissioner of Securities and Insurance she entered the campaign for US House of Representatives but lost the seat to Republican Denny Rehberg

Electoral history

References

External links
 

1962 births
21st-century American politicians
21st-century American women politicians
Living people
Democratic Party members of the Montana House of Representatives
Montana State University Billings alumni
Politicians from Billings, Montana
State insurance commissioners of the United States
Women state legislators in Montana